William Hoban Branson (February 14, 1938 – August 15, 2006) was an American economist. Considered a pioneer in the field of international economics, he was also noted for his intermediate level textbook Macroeconomic Theory and Policy. William Branson had three children, Kristin, William, and Emily. Shortly before his death his granddaughter was born, Maggie Branson Lynch.

Marriage to alleged Russian agent Elena Branson
In the late 1990's Branson, divorced from the mother of his three children, married a Russian-born economist, Elena Branson (née Chernykh). The two met at a conference of the International Monetary Fund. They purchased a condo in a building on the Upper West Side of Manhattan; Branson adopted Elena's daughter as well. According to Branson's daughter Emily, Elena Branson "blew all his money," and convinced him to cut his biological children out of his will. 

Years after William Branson's death, the Upper West Side condo was raided by the FBI as part of an investigation into Elena Branson's activities on behalf of the Russian government. She fled the United States and appeared on Russia Today with convicted Russian agent Maria Butina. 

In 2022, the FBI Counterintelligence Division formally accused Elena Branson of acting as an unauthorized agent of the Russian government in the United States. Elena Branson's alleged work for the Russian government overlaps with previously-known Russian interference in the 2016 United States elections.

Selected publications

References

External links 
 Branson's CV at NBER

1938 births
2006 deaths
People from Springfield, Illinois
Economists from Illinois
United States Naval Academy alumni
University of California, Berkeley alumni
Massachusetts Institute of Technology alumni
Princeton University faculty
20th-century American economists
American textbook writers
Military personnel from Illinois